Richard Wünsch (1 June 1869 in Wiesbaden – 17 May 1915 at Iłża) was a German classical philologist.

He studied classical philology at the University of Marburg, receiving his doctorate in 1893. Following graduation, he spent two years on an extended study trip to Paris, Spain, Italy and Greece. He obtained his habilitation in Breslau, and in 1902 was appointed professor of classical philology at the University of Giessen. Later on, he held professorships at the universities of Königsberg (from 1907) and Münster (from 1913). In World War I he died at Iłża, while serving as a battalion leader during an assault on the Russian army.

Selected works 
 De Taciti Germaniae codicibus Germanicis, 1893.
 Sethianische Verfluchungstafeln aus Rom, 1898 – Sethian curse tablets of Rome.
 Ioannis Laurentii Lydi liber de mensibus (edition of John the Lydian; 1898).
 Das Frühlingsfest der Insel Malta, 1902 – The spring festival of Malta. 
 Antikes Zaubergerät aus Pergamon, 1905 – Ancient magical devices of Pergamon.
 Antike Fluchtafeln, 1907 – Ancient curse tablets.
 Aus einem griechischen Zauberpapyrus, 1911 – Greek Magical Papyri.
As editor: 
 Eine Mithrasliturgie (by Albrecht Dieterich; 2nd edition by Wünsch in 1910) – A Mithras Liturgy.
 Mutter Erde : ein Versuch über Volksreligion (by Albrecht Dieterich; 2nd edition by Wünsch in 1913) – Mother Earth; an essay on folk religion.

References 

1869 births
1915 deaths
People from Wiesbaden
German classical philologists
University of Marburg alumni
Academic staff of the University of Giessen
Academic staff of the University of Münster
Academic staff of the University of Königsberg